The Cypriot Third Division (Greek: Πρωτάθλημα Γ΄ Κατηγορίας) is the third tier football league competition in Cyprus, run by the Cyprus Football Association. Each year, the top finishing teams of the league are promoted to the Cypriot Second Division, and the lowest finishing teams are relegated to the STOK Elite Division.

History
The Cypriot Third Division was held for the first time in the 1970–71 season as the third level of the Cypriot football. All the teams played against each other twice, once at their home and once away. The team with the most points at the end of the season crowned champions. This is the league's current format until present time.

The only season when the championship not held was during the 1974–75 season. Due to the Turkish invasion of Cyprus which forced many teams that had their headquarters to the north Cyprus to be closed temporarily or permanently, CFA decided to have a Special mixed championship of Second & Third Division. In this championship could participate all the teams of the Second and Third Division. Participation was optional. The championship had two geographical groups. The winners of each group were playing against each other in the final phase and the winners were the champions of the league. The winner was considered as the 1974–75 Cypriot Second Division champions.

Until the 1983–84 season, the teams that were relegated from the Cypriot Third Division were taking part in the next season's amateur leagues. From the 1984–85 season until the 2013–14 season, the teams that were relegated from the Cypriot Third Division were taking part in the next season's Cypriot Fourth Division. Since the 2014–15 season, the teams that are relegated from the Cypriot Third Division are taking part in the next season's STOK Elite Division.

From 1971–72 season until 2007–08 season, the Third Division teams were taking part in the Cypriot Cup. No Third Division team ever reached the final or the semifinals, but they managed to qualify to the quarter-finals once (Chalkanoras Idaliou in 1987–88). Since 2008–09 season, the Third Division teams are not allowed to participate in the Cypriot Cup, but they can take part to the Cypriot Cup for lower divisions (participation in this cup is not compulsory).

Structure 
The championship have the same structure since its foundation. All the teams are playing against each other twice, once at their home and once away. The team with the most points at the end of the season are crowned champions. In every season, the champions or the first teams were promoted to the Second Division, but in some seasons the relegation to the lower divisions didn't existed.

Current format (2018–19)
Sixteen clubs are competing in the league, playing each other twice, once at home and once away for a total of 30 games per team. The top four teams are promoted to the Cypriot Second Division and the bottom four are relegated to the STOK Elite Division.

Points system
The points system of the Cypriot Third Division changed during the years:
 From 1970–71 until 1990–91 season, teams were awarded two points for a win, one point for a draw and zero points for a defeat.
 Since 1991–92 season (until present time), teams are awarded three points for a win, one point for a draw and zero points for a defeat.

Teams
The fourteen teams which participate in the 2021–22 Cypriot Third Division are:

Winners
The table presents all the winners of the Cypriot Third Division.

Performance By Club

Number of participating, promoted and relegated teams per season
The number of the participated teams and the number of the teams that were promoted to the Cypriot Second Division and the teams that were relegated were changed many times during the years.

1No relegation, but two teams were expelled from the CFA on the category of match-fixing.

2The 3rd placed team played playoff matches against the 12th team of the Second Division. The Third Division team won and promoted to the Second Division.

3The 3rd placed team played playoff matches against the 12th team of the Second Division and lost.

4The 2nd placed team played playoff matches against the 9th team of the Second Division and lost.

5The 9th placed team played playoff matches against the 2nd team of the Fourth Division. The Third Division team won and remained to the Third Division.

6The 4th placed team played playoff matches against the three last teams of the Second Division and lost.

7The last three teams played playoff matches against the 4th team of the Fourth Division. The winner was the 4th team of the Fourth Division and so the last three teams of the Third Division were relegated.

8The 12th placed team played playoff matches against the 4th team of the Fourth Division and won. So only 2 teams were relegated.

Participations per club
So far, 101 teams participated in the Cypriot Third Division since 1970–71 (including the 2016–17 season).

1 The team has 7 participations as Tsaggaris Peledriou and 1 participation as Sotirios Pelendriou.

2 The team has 4 participations as APEP Limassol and 3 participations as APEP Pitsilias.

3 The team has 2 participations as AEM Mesogis and 2 participations as AEM Mesogis/Giolou.

League or status at 2016–17:

See also
 Football in Cyprus
 Cypriot football league system
 Cypriot First Division
 Cypriot Second Division
 STOK Elite Division
 Cypriot Cup
 Cypriot Cup for lower divisions

References

External links 
 Cyprus Football Association

 
3
Third level football leagues in Europe